Calliophis is a genus of venomous elapid snakes, one of several known commonly as oriental coral snakes or Asian coral snakes.

Species
Species in this genus are:
 Calliophis beddomei (M.A. Smith, 1943) – Beddome's coral snake (India)
 Calliophis bibroni (Jan, 1858) – Bibron's coral snake (India)
 Calliophis bilineatus (Peters, 1881) – Two-stripped coral snake (Philippines)
 Calliophis bivirgatus (F. Boie, 1827) – Blue Malaysian coral snake (Indonesia, Cambodia, Malaysia, Singapore, Thailand)
 Calliophis castoe E.N. Smith, Ogale, Deepak & Giri, 2012 – Castoe’s coral snake (India)
 Calliophis gracilis Gray, 1835 – Spotted coral snake (Thailand, Malaysia, Indonesia, Singapore)
Calliophis haematoetron E.N. Smith, Manamendra-Arachchi & Somweera, 2008 – Blood-bellied coral snake (Sri Lanka)
 Calliophis intestinalis (Laurenti, 1768) – Banded Malaysian coral snake (Indonesia, Malaysia)
 Calliophis maculiceps (Günther, 1858) – Speckled coral snake (Myanmar, Thailand, Malaysia, Vietnam, Cambodia, Laos)
 Calliophis melanurus (Shaw, 1802) – Slender coral snake, Indian coral snake (India, Bangladesh, Sri Lanka)
 Calliophis nigrescens (Günther, 1862) – Black coral snake  (India)
 Calliophis nigrotaeniatus (Peters, 1863) – banded Malaysian coral snake, striped coral snake  (Indonesia, Malaysia )
 Calliophis philippinus (Günther, 1864) – Philippine coral snake (the Philippines)
 Calliophis salitan (Brown, Smart, Leviton, & Smith, 2018) – Dinagat Island banded coral snake (the Philippines)
 Calliophis suluensis (Steindachner, 1891) – Sulu Islands banded coral snake (the Philippines)

Nota bene: A binomial authority in parentheses indicates that the species was originally described in a genus other than Calliophis.

Taxonomy
The former Calliophis calligaster, the barred coral snake (Philippines), is now in the genus Hemibungarus.

Both Kellogg's coral snake (formerly C. kelloggi ) (Vietnam, Laos, China) and MacClelland's coral snake (formerly C. macclellandi ) are now in the genus Sinomicrurus.

Behaviour
Snakes of the genus Calliophis are semifossorial.

References

Further reading
 Boulenger GA. 1896. Catalogue of the Snakes in the British Museum (Natural History). Volume III., Containing the Colubridæ (Opisthoglyphæ and Proteroglyphæ), ... London: Trustees of the British Museum (Natural History). (Taylor and Francis, printers). xiv + 727 pp. + Plates I-XXV. (Genus Callophis [sic], p. 396).
 Gray JE. 1834. Illustrations of Indian Zoology; Chiefly Selected from the Collection of Major-General Hardwicke, F.R.S., ... Vol. II. London: Adolphus Richter and Co. 102 plates. (Calliophis gracilis, Plate 86, Figures 1 & 3).
 Smith MA. 1943. The Fauna of British India, Ceylon and Burma, Including the Whole of the Indo-Chinese Sub-region. Reptilia and Amphibia. Vol. III.—Serpentes. London: Secretary of State for India. (Taylor and Francis, printers). xii + 583 pp. (Genus Callophis [sic], pp. 418–419).

External links

 
Snake genera
Taxa named by John Edward Gray